The Ukrainian Museum-Archives (UMA), founded in 1952 in Cleveland, Ohio, United States, is a museum dedicated to collecting literature, recordings, artifacts and other items that represent Ukrainian culture, Ukrainian immigration to America, and the history of Ukrainians in Cleveland. It was founded by Leonid Bachynsky and Alexander Fedynsky, a Ukrainian immigrant who arrived in Cleveland in 1948. It is located at 1202 Kenilworth Avenue, formerly a convent.

With over 20,000 books, 1,000 different newspapers and magazines, 2,000 78 rpms and LP records and tens of thousands of posters, postcards, stamps, etc., Cleveland's Ukrainian archives are one of the largest archives in North America.

The UMA holds frequent art exhibitions and also has online exhibitions, which can be viewed on their website.

References

External links

Museums in Cleveland
Tremont, Cleveland
Archives in the United States
Ethnic museums in Ohio
1952 establishments in Ohio
Museums established in 1952
Ukrainian-American culture in Ohio
Ukrainian museums in the United States